Gituru is a sub-location in Ruchu Location, Kandara division in Murang'a County.

It is a tea growing area whose attitude is 2,100M located to the east of Ndakaini Dam. It is approximately 86 km from Nairobi.

Tea and dairy farming are the major economic activities.

There are two secondary schools and a primary school with the same name besides several churches.

Gituru is made of eight ridges namely Gituru, Kiganjo, Kirika, Kiawangenye, Gatondo, Kiariia, Kiruga and Kagongo-Gacheke.

Gituru is a settlement in Kenya's Central Province.

References 

Populated places in Central Province (Kenya)